Stade Municipal de Djougou is a multi-use stadium in Djougou, Benin.  It is currently used mostly for football matches and is the home ground of Panthères FC of the Benin Premier League.  The stadium has a capacity of 3,400 spectators.

References

External links
 Stadium information

Football venues in Benin